1-α-O-Galloylpunicalagin is an ester of gallic acid and punicalagin, a type of ellagitannin. It is found in the pomegranate (Punica granatum) and in Combretum glutinosum.

A study in Taiwan showed that 1-α-O-galloylpunicalagin induced nitric oxide production in a dose-dependent manner in endothelial cells via the PI3K/AKT/mTOR pathway.

References 

Pomegranate ellagitannins
Heterocyclic compounds with 7 or more rings
Oxygen heterocycles